Pithole Creek is a  tributary of the Allegheny River in Northwest Pennsylvania in the United States.

See also
 List of rivers of Pennsylvania
 List of tributaries of the Allegheny River

References

Rivers of Pennsylvania
Tributaries of the Allegheny River
Rivers of Forest County, Pennsylvania
Rivers of Venango County, Pennsylvania